Patrick Ricard (born May 27, 1994) is an American football fullback and occasional defensive lineman for the Baltimore Ravens of the National Football League (NFL). He played college football at Maine.

Early years
Ricard played high school football at David Prouty High School in Spencer, Massachusetts, and was named the Central Massachusetts Division II Defensive MVP twice.

College career
Ricard played for the Maine Black Bears of the University of Maine from 2013 to 2016 as a defensive lineman. He was redshirted in 2012. He played in all 13 games in 2013, recording 19 solo tackles, 40 tackle assists, 1 sack, 2 pass breakups and 1 forced fumble. Ricard was named College Sports Journal FCS Second Team All-Freshman. He played in 10 games, starting 9, in 2014, totaling 19 solo tackles, 27 tackle assists, 4.5 sacks, 6 pass breakups and 1 blocked kick. He played in 10 games, all starts, in 2015, recording 25 solo tackles, 28 tackle assists, 7 sacks, 2 pass breakups, 3 forced fumbles. Ricard earned First Team All-CAA and ECAC Division I FCS Second Team All-Star honors. He played in 11 games, all starts, in 2016, totaling 25 solo tackles, 25 tackle assists, 5.5 sacks, 1 pass breakup and 1 blocked kick. He garnered First Team All-CAA, ECAC Division I FCS First Team All-Star, STATS FCS Third Team All-American and New England Football Writers Division I All-New England Team recognition. Ricard played in 44 games during his college career, recording 208 total tackles, 18 sacks, 11 pass breakups, 3 forced fumbles, 1 fumble recovery and 2 blocked kicks. He majored in economics while at the University of Maine.

Professional career
Ricard was rated the 30th best defensive tackle in the 2017 NFL Draft by NFLDraftScout.com.

Baltimore Ravens

After going undrafted, Ricard signed with the Baltimore Ravens on May 5, 2017. During the offseason, he spent time practicing on both offense and defense with the Ravens. During the preseason, he played defensive end and fullback. He made the 53-man roster as the only fullback on the team. In Week 8 against the Miami Dolphins, he recorded a one-yard reception for the first catch of his NFL career. In Week 13 against the Detroit Lions, he recorded a three-yard reception for his first professional touchdown.

In Week 1 of the 2019 season against the Miami Dolphins, Ricard caught a one-yard touchdown pass, his lone touchdown of the season, from Lamar Jackson in a 59–10 blowout victory. In Week 10 against the Cincinnati Bengals, Ricard strip sacked Ryan Finley, his first sack and forced fumble of his career, with the ball being picked up by Tyus Bowser and returned 33 yards for a touchdown. The Ravens routed the Bengals 49–13. On December 3, 2019, Ricard signed a two-year contract extension with the Ravens through the 2021 season. Nine days later in Week 15 against the New York Jets, Ricard partially blocked a 49-yard field goal attempt by Sam Ficken in a 42–21 win. On offense, Ricard finished the regular season with eight catches for 47 yards and a touchdown. On defense and special teams, he had nine tackles, one sack and forced fumble, one pass breakup, and the aforementioned blocked field goal. He was selected to his first Pro Bowl.

In 2020, Ricard for the first time in his professional career did not appear in any plays on defense. Ricard was placed on the reserve/COVID-19 list by the Ravens on November 27, 2020, and activated on December 7, 2020. On January 6, 2022, Ricard suffered a knee injury and was placed on Injured Reserve.

On March 21, 2022, Ricard signed a three-year contract extension with the Ravens.

References

External links

Baltimore Ravens bio

Living people
1994 births
American football defensive linemen
American football fullbacks
Maine Black Bears football players
Baltimore Ravens players
Players of American football from Massachusetts
People from Spencer, Massachusetts
Sportspeople from Worcester County, Massachusetts
American Conference Pro Bowl players